Sakuntla  Devi is an Indian politician and a member of  the Sixteenth Legislative Assembly of Uttar Pradesh in India. She represents the Powayan constituency of Uttar Pradesh from 2012 to 2017 and is a member of the  Samajwadi Party.

Life and education
Sakuntla Devi was born in Shahjahanpur to Dinanath. She attended the Chatripati Shivaji Inter Jogi Ther College and is educated till eighth grade. She married Mithlesh Kumar in 1987. They have two sons and a daughter.

Political career
Sakuntla  Devi has been a MLA for one term. She represented the  Powayan constituency and is a member of  the Samajwadi Party political party.

Posts held

See also

 Powayan (Assembly constituency)
 Uttar Pradesh Legislative Assembly

References 

1972 births
Living people
People from Shahjahanpur district
Samajwadi Party politicians
Uttar Pradesh MLAs 2012–2017